Babe Nanki University College, Mithra (also known as Bebe Nanaki G.N.D.U College Mithra or Mithra College) is one of the constituent colleges established with the collective efforts of the UGC, Punjab Government and Guru Nanak Dev University Amritsar. It aims to providing quality education to students of the rural Kapurthala District.

The aim of this college is to provide the quality education to the downtrodden, weak and poor that are deprived of higher education due to poor financial conditions.  In this way it aims at linking these people to the national mainstream and making them active participants in the social, political and academic development of the country.

Curriculum 
It provides a wide range of bachelor programs such as B.A., B.C.A, B.com (regular or professional), B.sc (medical, non-medical, information technology computer science and fashion designing) and B.b.a. along with master programs such as M.A. Punjabi, M.com, M.sc it etc.

It consists of different departments namely, the departments of science, commerce, information technology and the department of arts and social sciences.

References

External links 
 
Punjab Colleges Description
 http://bnucmithra.blogspot.in/2014/08/about-college.html?m=0

Guru Nanak Dev University
Kapurthala district